Chiromachla insulare is a moth of the family Erebidae. It is found on the Comoros, La Réunion and in Madagascar, Mauritius and Tanzania.

The larvae feed on Crassocephalum rubens and Senecio acetosaefolius.

References

Nyctemerina
Moths described in 1833